Yudai Mori (森 雄大, born August 19, 1994 in Fukuoka, Fukuoka Prefecture) is a Japanese professional baseball pitcher for the Tohoku Rakuten Golden Eagles in Japan's Nippon Professional Baseball.

External links

NPB stats

1994 births
Living people
Japanese expatriate baseball players in Mexico
Nippon Professional Baseball pitchers
Tohoku Rakuten Golden Eagles players
Baseball people from Fukuoka (city)
Cañeros de Los Mochis players